Alvin K. C. Ng (born 17 October 1989) has been an apprentice jockey since July 2008. He rides for the Hong Kong Jockey Club.

In late 2011, Ng won 7 races of 43. He added 20 wins in the 2011/12 season, and in 2012/13 he won another 20 races in an unsuccessful bid for the apprentice jockeys' title. He took his Hong Kong career total to 49 with 2 wins in the 2013/14 season.

Career totals

References

Hong Kong jockeys
Living people
1989 births